Laura-Lee Smith (born 21 November 1978 in Christchurch, New Zealand) is a table tennis player for New Zealand. At the 2002 Commonwealth Games she won a bronze medal in the women's team event.

References

1978 births
New Zealand female table tennis players
Commonwealth Games bronze medallists for New Zealand
Sportspeople from Christchurch
Living people
Table tennis players at the 2002 Commonwealth Games
Commonwealth Games medallists in table tennis
Medallists at the 2002 Commonwealth Games